The 2022 World Junior Alpine Skiing Championships was held from 3rd to 9th March, 2022 in Panorama Ski Resort in Invermere, Canada.

Medal summary

Men's events

Women's events

Mixed events

Medal table

References

World Junior Alpine Skiing Championships
World Junior Alpine Skiing Championships
2022 in Canadian sports
2022 in youth sport
International sports competitions hosted by Canada
March 2022 sports events in Canada